The Alsek River (Tlingit Aalseix̱' ) is a wilderness river flowing from Yukon into Northern British Columbia and into Alaska. It enters the Gulf of Alaska at Dry Bay.

Most of the Alsek River's basin is within protected wilderness areas and National Parks. The Alsek and its main tributary, the Tatshenshini River, are part of the Canadian Heritage Rivers System and a UNESCO World Heritage Site.

In the year 2016, the Alsek River captured the flow of the Slims River due to the retreat of Kaskawulsh Glacier. Researchers attributed the change in flow to human-caused climate change; this was the first time human-caused climate change was implicated in the reorganization of a river.

Research indicates that in a few decades, Alsek River may further change its final course. The rapidly retreating Grand Plateau Glacier separates Alsek River and lake from nearby Grand Plateau Lake. Geologists predict that when the two lakes merge, Alsek River will abandon its current outlet in favour of the steeper way to the ocean through Grand Plateau Lake and a small embankment, moving its outlet some 17 miles (28 km) to the southeast, within the confines of Glacier Bay National Park.

Course 

The Alsek starts at the confluence of the Dezadeash River and Kaskawulsh River in Kluane National Park and Reserve. After flowing south into the northwestern tip of British Columbia, it is joined by the Tatshenshini River in Tatshenshini-Alsek Park. Finally after passing through the glacier-fed Alsek Lake, it reaches the Pacific Ocean at Dry Bay, in the Gulf of Alaska, south of Yakutat, Alaska, close to the northern end of the Alaska Panhandle. Although the river is navigable by kayak or rubber raft in its northern reaches, it rapidly becomes unnavigable—for any but the most experienced and skilled kayakers—at Turnback Canyon.

On older maps, the Alsek river is labeled as the Kaskawulsh and The Tatshenshini as the Alsek. Some Yukon First Nation elders also refer to the river as the Kaskawulsh.

The river flows next to the Lowell Glacier which has sometimes blocked off the river and created a large lake behind it, "Neoglacial Lake Alsek." The last such blockage took place in 1850; its release created a massive flood, washing away everything in its path on the way to the Pacific.

The river carries a lot of silt from the Alsek lake/glacier, which contributes to the river's low temperature.

The Alsek and nearby East Alsek rivers were at one time connected, and the old river bed can still be made out on some maps.

The Alsek Glacier contacts the Grand Plateau Glacier, which faces the shoreline. Also in the same general area are the Doame foothills and Doame River.

History 
The first known kayak descent of Turnback Canyon was by Walt Blackadar, who ran the canyon solo on August 25, 1971. He wrote about his trip for Sports Illustrated. "This has been a day!," he wrote in his journal. "I want any other kayaker or would-be expert to read my words well. The Alsek Gorge is unpaddleable!" Despite this sincere warning from a man who apparently felt lucky to be alive, groups of expert kayakers have successfully run Turnback Canyon since then. A prominent mountain which overlooks the Alsek was named Mount Blackadar in his honor.

The portion of the river inside Kluane National Park has been designated a Canadian Heritage River.

In 1958, a magnitude 7.7 earthquake centered near Lituya bay significantly changed the lay of the land. The earthquake caused the Doame River and East Alsek River to join together.

In the year 2016, after capturing the flow of the Slims River, the Alsek River's flow increased dramatically.

Fishing 
The Alsek and East Alsek rivers are a part of the Yakutat area limited entry set gillnet fishery. Both rivers produce king, silver, and sockeye commercially. Chum and pink salmon can also be caught, but are not generally sought after due to their relative lack of worth/quality. These two rivers can be characterized as low volume fisheries, while the Alsek river in particular produces particularly high quality salmon due to its low temperature. The Alsek's silt content also prevents the sun from damaging the fish.

The area also supports subsistence and sport fishing. There are multiple local sport fishing, sight-seeing, hunting, and animal watching lodges

See also 
List of rivers of Alaska
List of Yukon rivers
List of British Columbia rivers
List of rivers of the Americas by coastline

References

Further reading 

Jettmar, Karen (2008). The Alaska River Guide: Canoeing, Kayaking and Rafting in the Last Frontier. Menasha Ridge Press. 
Cassidy, Jim, and Dunlap, Dan (1999). World Whitewater: A Global Guide for River Runners. McGraw-Hill. 
Embick, Andrew (1994). Fast and Cold: A Guide to Alaska Whitewater. Valdez Alpine Books. .
Lyman, Russ, et al. (2000). The Complete Guide to the Tatshenshini River Including the Upper Alsek River. Haines, Alaska: Cloudburst Productions. 
Watters, Ron (1995). Never Turn Back: The Life of Whitewater Pioneer Walt Blackadar. The Great Rift Press.  (hardcover)  (paperback)

External links 

Alsek River Description
 Canadian Heritage Rivers System: Alsek
 National Whitewater River Inventory: Alsek
 National Whitewater River Inventory: Tatshenshini
 First-person account of running the Alsek River
 Alsek River Rafting Information

Rivers of Alaska
Rivers of British Columbia
Rivers of Yukon
Canadian Heritage Rivers
Atlin District
Rivers of Yakutat City and Borough, Alaska
International rivers of North America